In Greek mythology, Lycorus or Lycoreus (Ancient Greek: Λυκωρεύς) may refer to the following personages:
 Lycoreus or Lycorus, was a son of Apollo and the nymph Corycia. After him a city was named Lycoreia (later Delphi, after Delphus, great-grandson of Lycorus). He was father of Hyamus.
 Lycoreus, a companion of Amycus. was the henchman of King Amycusof the Bebrycians, people living in northern Asia Minor that were visited by the Argonauts.
 Lycoreus, a defender of Thebes in the war of the Seven against Thebes, killed by Amphiaraus.

In modern fiction, one bearer of the name is Licorus Black, wizard in Harry Potter, the first known member of the Noble House of Black.

Notes

References 

 Apollonius Rhodius, Argonautica translated by Robert Cooper Seaton (1853-1915), R. C. Loeb Classical Library Volume 001. London, William Heinemann Ltd, 1912. Online version at the Topos Text Project.
 Apollonius Rhodius, Argonautica. George W. Mooney. London. Longmans, Green. 1912. Greek text available at the Perseus Digital Library.
 Gaius Julius Hyginus, Fabulae from The Myths of Hyginus translated and edited by Mary Grant. University of Kansas Publications in Humanistic Studies. Online version at the Topos Text Project.
 Pausanias, Description of Greece with an English Translation by W.H.S. Jones, Litt.D., and H.A. Ormerod, M.A., in 4 Volumes. Cambridge, MA, Harvard University Press; London, William Heinemann Ltd. 1918. . Online version at the Perseus Digital Library
 Pausanias, Graeciae Descriptio. 3 vols. Leipzig, Teubner. 1903.  Greek text available at the Perseus Digital Library.
 Publius Papinius Statius, The Thebaid translated by John Henry Mozley. Loeb Classical Library Volumes. Cambridge, MA, Harvard University Press; London, William Heinemann Ltd. 1928. Online version at the Topos Text Project.
 Publius Papinius Statius, The Thebaid. Vol I-II. John Henry Mozley. London: William Heinemann; New York: G.P. Putnam's Sons. 1928. Latin text available at the Perseus Digital Library.

Kings of Phocis
Kings in Greek mythology
Children of Apollo
Demigods in classical mythology
Characters in the Argonautica
Phocian characters in Greek mythology
Mythology of Phocis